Malmöhus is a neighbourhood of Malmö, situated in the Borough of Centrum, Malmö Municipality, Scania County (formerly Malmöhus County), Sweden.

References

Neighbourhoods of Malmö